Le Couteur is a surname, and may refer to:

 Caroline Le Couteur (born 1952), Australian politician
 George Le Couteur (1915–1978), Australian wool broker, economist and company director
 Jean Le Couteur (1916–2010), French architect
 John Le Couteur (general) (1760–1835), British military officer and colonial official
 John Le Couteur (1794–1875), British Army officer
 Kenneth Le Couteur (1920–2011), British physicist
 Philip Le Couteur (1885–1958), Australian philosopher and educator